Ceodes is a genus of flowering plants belonging to the family Nyctaginaceae.

Its native range is Eastern Tropical Africa to Pacific.

Species:

Ceodes brunoniana 
Ceodes corniculata 
Ceodes grandis 
Ceodes longirostris 
Ceodes umbellifera

References

Nyctaginaceae
Caryophyllales genera